George Forster Tufnell  (1723–1798), was a British politician who sat in the House of Commons in two parliaments between 1761 and 1780.
 
Tufnell was the son of Samuel Tufnell MP of Monken Hadley, Hertfordshire and Langleys, Essex and his wife  Elizabeth Cressener, daughter of George Cressener of Earl's Colne, Essex. He married firstly Elizabeth Forster  daughter of Richard Forster of Forest, county Dublin on  11 February  1744. They were divorced by Act of Parliament on 9 June 1758.

Tufnell succeeded his brother John Jolliffe Tufnell as Member of Parliament for Beverley in the 1761 general election. In 1767 he made a second marriage to Mary Farhill, daughter of John Farhill of Chichester, Sussex. He did not stand in 1768, but he contested Beverley again at the by-election of 1772. He was beaten by large majority as apparently he only  declared himself a candidate shortly before the poll began. However, in the 1774 general election he was elected MP for Beverley with a comfortable majority. In 1779 he planned to stand in a by-election at Middlesex, but was not allowed to resign. He did not stand at the general election of 1780.

Tufnell died on 10 July 1798. His son, William, was later MP for Colchester.

References

1723 births
1798 deaths
British MPs 1754–1761
British MPs 1761–1768
British MPs 1774–1780
Members of the Parliament of Great Britain for English constituencies